Bhavnagar West is one of the 182 Legislative Assembly constituencies of Gujarat state in India. It is part of Bhavnagar district.

List of segments
This assembly seat represents the following segments,

 Bhavnagar Taluka (Part) Villages – Nari, Vartej (CT)
 Bhavnagar Taluka (Part) – Bhavnagar Municipal Corporation (Part) Ward No. – 1, 8, 9, 10, 11, 12, 16, 17

Members of Legislative Assembly

Election results

2022

2017

2012

See also
 List of constituencies of the Gujarat Legislative Assembly
 Bhavnagar district

References

External links
 

Assembly constituencies of Gujarat
Bhavnagar district